Rémy Ourdan is a French journalist, war correspondent for the newspaper Le Monde, and documentary filmmaker.

Biography

Journalism
Rémy Ourdan began as a reporter in 1992 in besieged Sarajevo. He covers for three decades the main conflicts in the world, as well as post-war, human rights and international justice issues. He also continues his long-term work on Sarajevo.

Film
Rémy Ourdan is the director of the documentary film The Siege (co-directed with Patrick Chauvel, Agat Films & Cie, 2016).

Various Publications
 "Après-guerre(s)" (foreword & "Sarajevo, après le siège"), edited by Rémy Ourdan, Autrement, Paris, 2001
 "A War, and Ricochets" ("WAR", VII, "WAR", de.MO, New York, 2003)
 "America vs Al Qaeda : A Foe's Best Friend" (Dispatches, "Beyond Iraq", 2008)
 "Le Monde, les grands reportages 1944-2009" (Les Arènes, Paris, 2009)
"Sarajevo, a love story" (foreword & "Soldier's Words", "Bosnia 1992-1995", edited by Jon Jones, Sarajevo, 2012)
 "Le Monde, les grands reportages 1944-2012" (Pocket, Paris, 2012)
 "Première nuit à Sarajevo" ("Robert Capa - 100 photos pour la liberté de la presse", Reporters Sans Frontières, Paris, 2015)
 "Partez ou vous allez tous mourir" (introduction, Bruno Philip, "Aung San Suu Khi, l’icône fracassée", Les Equateurs, Paris, 2017)

Other
Rémy Ourdan organized on April 6, 2012, for the 20th anniversary of the war in Bosnia, a reunion called "Sarajevo 2012", for which hundreds of war reporters came back to Sarajevo. He published, with Jon Jones and Gary Knight, the photo book Bosnia 1992-1995 (edited by Jon Jones, 2012), for which he wrote the foreword Sarajevo, a love story.

Rémy Ourdan is a co-founder and was the first director of the WARM Foundation on contemporary conflicts (2012-2019), based in Sarajevo.

Awards
 Bayeux-Calvados Awards for war correspondents 2000 for a story on the war in Sierra Leone (Le Monde, 1999).
 Bayeux-Calvados Awards for war correspondents 2012, Ouest-France/Jean-Marin Prize for a story on the Mexican drug war in Ciudad Juarez (Le Monde, 2012).
 Gold FIPA for Best Documentary 2016 for The Siege (Agat Films & Cie, 2016).

References

External links
 Rémy Ourdan website 
 Rémy Ourdan (Le Monde) 
 

Living people
French journalists
French war correspondents
War correspondents of the Yugoslav Wars
War correspondents of the War in Afghanistan (2001–2021)
War correspondents of the Iraq War
French documentary filmmakers
Year of birth missing (living people)